The Uruguay national under-16 and under-17 basketball team is a national basketball team of Uruguay, administered by the Federación Uruguaya de Básquetbol - "FUBB".

It represents the country in international under-16 and under-17 (under age 16 and under age 17) basketball competitions.

See also
Uruguay national basketball team
Uruguay national under-19 basketball team
Uruguay women's national under-17 basketball team

References

External links
Uruguay Basketball Records at FIBA Archive

U-17
Men's national under-17 basketball teams